The Castle Group is a marine engineering and construction company located in Hainesport Township, New Jersey. 

The Castle Group consists of three separate entities; W.J. Castle & Associates, Hydro-Marine Construction, and Simplified Bridge Systems.

W.J. Castle & Associates 
W.J. Castle & Associates, founded by William J. Castle in 1983, specializes in structural/civil engineering. They provide structural designs, inspection services, and testing to both government agencies and private contractors and companies. The Castle team includes Structural and Civil Engineerss. They employ Engineer-Divers with capabilities in underwater diagnostics and reporting, with the ability to develop repair designs as needed. Services include structural marine engineering, construction inspection and management, underwater inspection services, specialty designs, design/build, hydrographic/fathometric surveys, and side scan sonar.

Hydro-Marine Construction 
Hydro-Marine Construction, founded in 1997, is the construction division of The Castle Group and is staffed with certified commercial divers (Association of Diving Contractors International).  The Philadelphia Business Journal ranked Hydro-Marine #7 in South Jersey's 25 Fastest Growing Companies list. Hydro-Marine specializes in bulkhead and pier construction, pile jacking and repairs, submarine power cable recovery and replacement, CHANCE anchor installation, underwater debris removal, repairs to marine structures, and design/build services.

Simplified Bridge Systems 
Simplified Bridge Systems, founded in 2001, designs and builds customized bridges, then delivers and installs them on-site.  Services include design of customized bridges, demolition of existing structures, site preparation, design and fabrication, delivery and installation, new foundations, and finishing roadway approaches.

Notable projects

Nimitz Foundation Repair Design/Build 
In 2015, Castle completed work as a sub-consultant of G.W. Management on a design/build job at the Nimitz Library on the US Naval Academy. The work consisted primarily of the assessment, repair development, and rehabilitation of 27 concrete pile caps that support the library, which exhibited signification deterioration due to exposure to the brackish tidal waters of College Creek and the Severn River.  Castle completed the design of the repairs and Hydro-Marine completed the construction.

Quay Pier: Philadelphia, Pennsylvania 

On March 16, 2006, the Quay Pier along the Delaware River located in Penn’s Landing was struck by a tanker causing extensive damage to the pier. Since Castle had previously performed the inspection and repair of several piers for DRWC, Castle was requested to perform an emergency underwater inspection of the pier to determine the extent of the damage. Hydro-Marine  performed the emergency underwater repairs required to stabilize the pier. These repairs were completed by July 2006.

Submarine Cable Repairs: Ocean City, New Jersey 

In January 2010, Hydro-Marine divers assisted Atlantic City Electric in locating and repairing a damaged submarine power cable. There were approximately 500 to 600 feet of damaged 25K submarine cable lying under the ground. To locate the break in the cable, Atlantic City Electric had to send a high-frequency sound through the cable, while Hydro Marine divers used a Cable Finder to locate the exact point of the break. For each break that was found, workers repaired it by cutting out the faulty section and then splicing in a new section of cable. 

Once the cable was fully repaired, it was then placed back on the channel bottom and reburied by jetting. The entire project was completed by late February 2010.

Roebling Bridge: Roebling, New Jersey 

Castlewas retained by WRS Infrastructure & Environment, Inc. in October 2008 to perform an in-depth inspection of the Roebling Bridge, in Roebling, New Jersey. Once the analysis was complete, Castle designed a new bridge utilizing the existing main steel beams and the concrete substructure with modifications and repairs. Hydro-Marine  performed the actual construction of the bridge. Removal of the existing structure began in November 2008, the deck was poured the first week in January 2009, and the bridge was open to traffic by January 23, 2009.

Awards and recognition 

 2009 Project Excellence Award in the Small Project Category by Coasts, Oceans, Ports, and Rivers Institute (COPRI) for the Castle's Quay Pier project.
 ACEC 2010 Distinguished Award for work on the Roebling Bridge Replacement.
 Honorable Mention Award from Pennsylvania Society of Professional Engineers (PSPE) Philly Chapter for the Roebling Steel Plant Bridge Project in 2010 .
 Delaware Valley Association of Structural Engineers (DVASE) “Outstanding Project Award for work on the Nimitz Library

External links 
 The Castle Group Home Page
 The Castle Group Blog
 Bulkhead Inspection Services

Construction and civil engineering companies of the United States
Companies established in 1983
Companies based in New Jersey
1983 establishments in New Jersey
Hainesport Township, New Jersey